This is a list of works by the Early Netherlandish artist Jan van Eyck. Van Eyck was not a prolific artist, with only twenty-one paintings attributed to him by scholars. Van Eyck was the first major European artist to utilize oil painting. Though the use of oil paint preceded Van Eyck by many centuries, his virtuosic handling and manipulation of oil paint, use of glazes, wet-on-wet and other techniques was such that Giorgio Vasari started the myth that Van Eyck had invented oil painting

About 20 surviving paintings are confidently attributed to him, as well as the Ghent Altarpiece and the illuminated miniatures of the Turin-Milan Hours, all dated between 1432 and 1439. Ten are dated and signed with a variation of his motto ALS ICH KAN (As I (Eyck) can), a pun on his name, which he typically painted in Greek characters.

Paintings

Illuminated Manuscripts

Drawings

Lost Works

Contested

Workshop

References

Sources
 Borchert, Till-Holger. Van Eyck. London: Taschen, 2008. 

van Eyck
Eyck, Jan van
Paintings by Jan van Eyck